Iraq, often presented as the Iraqi Turkmen, has participated in the Turkvision Song Contest twice since its debut in , being represented by members of the Iraqi Turkmen community. The Iraqi broadcaster, Türkmeneli TV, has been the organiser for the Iraqi entry since its debut. In 2013, Iraq's first entry at Turkvision, Ahmed Duzlu, failed to qualify from the semi-finals. The broadcaster continued its participation as the Iraqi Turkmen community solely, rather than the entirety of Iraq, for the 2020 contest.

History

2010s
Iraq made their debut in the Turkvision Song Contest at the 2013 festival, in Eskişehir, Turkey. Iraq were represented by Ahmed Duzlu with the song “Kerkük’ten Yola Çıkak”, Iraq performed ninth in the semi final but failed to qualify for the final.

On 20 July 2014 it was announced that Iraq would make their second appearance at the Turkvision Song Contest 2014 to be held in Kazan, Tatarstan in November 2014. In 2014 Iraq once again selected Ahmed Duzlu to represent them in the contest, in Kazan he performed "Çal Kalbimi". Iraq performed nineteenth in the semi final and finished eighteenth with 155 points and so did not qualify for the final.

Participation overview

References 

Turkvision
Turkvision
Countries in the Turkvision Song Contest